Matelea reticulata, commonly called netted milkvine, is a species of flowering plant in the dogbane family (Apocynaceae). It is native North America, where it is endemic to the U.S. state of Texas. Its natural habitat is in thickets on rocky hillsides.

Matelea reticulata is an herbaceous perennial vine. It produces green-white flowers in the spring and summer.

References

reticulata